Pavona decussata, sometimes known as leaf coral, is a species of colonial stony coral in the family Agariciidae. It is found in shallow water in various reef habitats, particularly on gently sloping surfaces, in tropical parts of the western and central Indo-Pacific region.

Description
Colonies of Pavona decussata are submasive structures, usually with leafy appendages or branches. The colour varies, but may be greenish or some shade of brown, orange or creamy yellow.

Distribution and habitat
Pavona decussata is native to the western and central Indo-Pacific region. Its range extends from East Africa and the Red Sea to Japan, the East China Sea, the Philippines, Papua New Guinea and eastern Australia.

Status
Pavona decussata is a common species with a widespread distribution. The population trend is unknown, however this coral is susceptible to bleaching, and it is probable that the number of mature colonies is decreasing as a result of destruction of its reef habitats. Its conservation status has been assessed as being "vulnerable" by the International Union for Conservation of Nature.

References

Agariciidae
Corals described in 1846
Coral reefs